A signal mountain or signal peak is a mountain suited to sending and receiving visual signals, either from its topographic prominence and isolation or from being located where signal communications are most needed.  For example, Tennessee's Signal Mountain was used by Native Americans to send fire and smoke signals across the Tennessee Valley.  It was also used by the Union Army as a visual communications station during the American Civil War.  Mount Lassic in California has low prominence but is also known as Signal Peak due to the heliograph station that was located on this peak around 1900.  And the highest peak in the Pine Valley Range, Utah's Signal Peak, is "supposedly named because of its use in World War II when beacons were placed on the mountain to guide airplanes at night."

Mountains

See also

Signal Hill (disambiguation)
Lookout Mountain (disambiguation)

References